Richard "Rich" Lesser (born 1962) is an American businessman who has served as the Global Chair of American global management consultancy the Boston Consulting Group (BCG) since 2021. He previously served as CEO from 2013-2021.

Early life and education
Lesser grew up in Pittsburgh, Pennsylvania during the 1970s, a time of economic hardship for the city due to the collapse of the steel industry at the time.

He holds an MBA from Harvard Business School, where he was a Baker Scholar, and a bachelor's degree in Chemical Engineering, summa cum laude, from the University of Michigan.

Career
Lesser started his career as a product development engineer and group leader at Procter & Gamble. In 1988, Lesser joined BCG as a consultant. He served as the head of the New York Metro office system from 2000 to 2009, and as BCG's Chairman for North and South America from 2009 to 2012. He was elected to the firm's Executive Committee in 2006. Since joining BCG in 1988, Lesser's client work has focused on strategy, operations, leadership, and large-scale transformation. It is claimed he played a pivotal role in helping BCG become the only global management consulting firm to grow strongly through the 2008 recession.

In May 2012, he was elected the successor of Hans-Paul Bürkner as the Global Chief Executive Officer of Boston Consulting Group. Under his leadership, BCG more than doubled in size to over 22,000 employees and tripled in revenue, fueled by investments in new offices, digital and analytics, and capabilities to drive innovation and transformation. Lesser oversaw the launch of BCG Digital Ventures, a builder and accelerator of digital businesses; BCG Gamma, an analytics and machine-learning team; and BCG TURN, a turnaround, restructuring, and transformation unit; and more recently, the Center for Climate & Sustainability. He oversaw the launch of the Southern Communities Initiative, a partnership between BCG, PayPal, and Vista Equity Partners to help advance racial equity.

In 2021, Lesser was named the Top CEO in America by Glassdoor.

Other Involvements 

Lesser also serves as chief advisor to the World Economic Forum's (WEF) Alliance of CEO Climate Leaders. He previously served as a member of the WEF’s International Business Council and on the Board of Directors of the Business Roundtable, including serving as Chair of the CEO COVID-19 Task Force. 

He accelerated BCG's strong investments in social impact through its many partnerships, including the World Food Programme, Save the Children, and the World Wildlife Fund.

In December 2016, Lesser joined a business forum assembled by then president-elect Donald Trump to provide strategic and policy advice on economic issues. In August 2017, Lesser and other CEOs decided to disband the group.

Personal life 

Lesser is married and has three children.

References

External links
 BCG biography

American management consultants
Living people
Boston Consulting Group people
Harvard Business School alumni
University of Michigan alumni
1962 births
American chief executives
People from Pittsburgh